In enzymology, an oxalate oxidase is an oxalate degrading enzyme that catalyzes the chemical reaction:

oxalate + O2 + 2 H+  2 CO2 + H2O2

The 3 substrates of this enzyme are oxalate, O2, and H+, whereas its two products are CO2 and H2O2.

This enzyme belongs to the family of oxidoreductases, specifically those acting on the aldehyde or oxo group of donor with oxygen as acceptor.  The systematic name of this enzyme class is oxalate:oxygen oxidoreductase. Other names in common use include aero-oxalo dehydrogenase, and oxalic acid oxidase.  This enzyme participates in glyoxylate and dicarboxylate metabolism.  It uses Manganese as a cofactor.

Structural studies

References

 
 
 

EC 1.2.3
Flavoproteins
Manganese enzymes
Enzymes of known structure